In Socks Mode is the debut album by American band The Visible Men, released in 2002 on Leisure King Productions.

Overview
The instrumentation of In Socks Mode could be considered minimalist: most of the songs consist solely of piano and bass guitar, with slightly more than half of the tracks featuring light drum accompaniment.

Despite its low-key indie release, In Socks Mode was met with mostly positive reviews. In Music We Trust graded it with an "A", calling it "a shining example of pop music that is infectious and laden with hooks, but not overly accessible or simplified for your listening pleasures". Allmusic gave the album a rating of 3/5, praising the "wonderfully accomplished" piano techniques and the "sheer attractiveness" of his melodies, comparing it favorably to the Ben Folds Five, but criticizing the album's often low-brow lyricism.

Track listing
All songs composed by Dustin Lanker, except where otherwise noted.

"Dial Tone" – 3:44
"Core of the Planet" – 4:12
"Blow Shit Up" (Lanker, Dan Schmid) – 3:28
"$90" – 3:20
"Hall of Fame" – 3:09
"Strange Hash" (Lanker, Schmid) – 4:35
"Poker Face" – 2:33
"Semen Factory" – 5:00
"On the Sidelines" – 3:44
"King Shit" – 4:04

Credits

The Visible Men
Dustin Lanker – vocals, keyboards
Dan Schmid – bass
Jordan Glenn – drums (tracks 6, 10)

Additional musicians
Tony Figoli – drums (tracks 2, 4)
Tim Donahue – drums (tracks 1, 5, 8)
Ryan Sumner – drums (track 7)

Production
Produced and mixed by Bill Barnett, J. Scott McLean and The Visible Men at Gung-Ho Studios in Eugene, Oregon
Engineered by Bill Barnett, Don Latarski and Glen Bonney
Mastered by Jim Rusby, Sony Disc Manufacturing - Springfield Oregon
Track 3 recorded by Don Latarski at Crescent Studios in Eugene, Oregon.
Track 5 recorded by Glenn Bonney at Glenn Bonney Recording in Eugene, Oregon.

References

The Visible Men albums
2002 debut albums